Grindstone is an unincorporated community and census-designated place in Jefferson and Redstone townships, in Fayette County, Pennsylvania, United States. The community was a part of the Grindstone-Rowes Run CDP, before it was split into two separate CDPs for the 2010 census. As of the 2010 census, the population was 498. Its ZIP code is 15442.

Grindstone is primarily in southern Jefferson Township but extends south across Redstone Creek into the northern part of Redstone Township. It is bordered to the southeast by the community of Rowes Run.

Demographics

References

Census-designated places in Fayette County, Pennsylvania
Census-designated places in Pennsylvania